Max Hilaire (born 6 December 1985) is a Haitian professional footballer who plays as a midfielder for Stade Poitevin.

Club career
Born in Bondy, France, Hilaire started his career in 1993 with Blanc Mesnil SF and joined FC Aulnay-sous-Bois in 2000. After three years at Aulnay he left the club and signed with Association Sportive Chelles Football for the 2003–04 season. He played four years with AS Chelles before joining Noisy Le Grand FC in 2007. In the spring 2009 announced his signing with Aviron Bayonnais FC.

In 2012, Hilaire transferred to Pau FC of the Championnat de France amateur.

International career
Hilaire made his debut for the Haiti national team during 2014 World Cup CONCACAF qualification.

References

External links
 
 

1985 births
Living people
Sportspeople from Bondy
French sportspeople of Haitian descent
Association football midfielders
French footballers
Haitian footballers
Aviron Bayonnais FC players
FC Chambly Oise players
Stade Poitevin FC players
Haiti international footballers
Copa América Centenario players
Championnat National players
Citizens of Haiti through descent
Footballers from Seine-Saint-Denis